Mohamed Anoir Chamoune (born 6 November 1994) is a Comorian footballer who plays as a defender for Volcan Club and the Comoros national team.

International career
Chamoune made his senior international debut for Comoros in a 2021 FIFA Arab Cup qualification match against Palestine, a 5–1 defeat.

References

External links
 
 

1994 births
Living people
Comorian footballers
Comoros international footballers
Association football defenders